Abdur Rahman Khokon is a Bangladesh Nationalist Party politician and the former Member of Parliament of Barguna-1.

Career
Ahmed was elected to parliament from Barguna-1 as a Bangladesh Nationalist Party candidate in February 1996.

References

Bangladesh Nationalist Party politicians
Living people
6th Jatiya Sangsad members
Year of birth missing (living people)